Wabanaki, Wabenaki, Wobanaki, etc. may refer to:

 Wabanaki Confederacy, a confederation of five First Nations in North America
 Abenaki, one member Nation of the Wabanaki Confederacy
 People who speak one of the Eastern Algonquian languages

Language and nationality disambiguation pages